The North Korea national baseball team is the national baseball team of North Korea. The team represents North Korea in international competitions. The team is organized by the Baseball and Softball Association of DPR Korea.

International appearances

References

External links
North Koreans Finding a Taste for America's Pastime
North Korea at the Baseball Federation of Asia

Korean North
Baseball
Baseball in Korea